Statistics for Kidnapping in the United Kingdom are often hard to discover, due to the country's policies around the crime.

Studies

Notably, U.K. has special categorization for the crime of child abduction, it is categorized under the violence against the person, in place of kidnapping. According to the Offender Management Caseload Statistics, UK had recorded about 57 convicted kidnappings cases between 2007-2008. On 2008-2009, it was 21. The Caseload Statistics further notes that out of 98,820 prisoners in England and Wales, 217 were convicted of kidnapping. Of these 217 kidnappers, 208 were men, and 9 were women. Other analysis speaks about the criminal histories, using the official records as the source. About 7042 males and 545 females who had been jailed for their convicted kidnapping between 1979 and 2001. Only 10 men and 14 women had been sentenced for more than 1 convicted kidnapping. The average age of kidnappers is around mid 20s, and more than 1/2 of the men, and 1/3 of the women kidnappers had been convicted of other offenses, usually thieving and violence.

Prevalence
A 2004 Home Office research study presented 798 police reports regarding child abduction in England and Wales. Of those reports, that 56% (447) involved a stranger, about 375 were attempted abductions while 72 were successful.

The kidnapping figures published by the Office for National Statistics recorded about 532 cases of child abductions that were reported to police in 2011/12. Figures do not include Scotland.

An estimated of 500 cases of parental kidnapping are reported in the country, every year.

Notable incidents

There have been incidents in which kidnapping was faked. In 1992, Joanna Grenside, an aerobics teacher from Harpenden, England, had staged her disappearance to avoid Christmas.

References

 
Crime in the United Kingdom by type